A turban is a type of headwear consisting of cloth wound around the wearer's head.

Turban may also refer to:

Places
 Turban Geyser, geyser in the Upper Geyser Basin of Yellowstone National Park in the United States

People
People with the surname Turban include:
 Dietlinde Turban (born 1957), German actress
 Marko Turban (born 1967), Estonian high jumper

Animals
 Cidaris, a genus of echinoderm
 Turbinidae or Turban snails, a family of sea snails

Plants
 Turban lily, common name for various species of lily
 Turban squash, type of squash closely related to the buttercup squash

Other uses
 Radical 50, the "turban" or "scarf" radical in the Kangxi Dictionary system of classifying Chinese characters
 Turban Head eagle, American gold coin
 Turban helmet, a Turkish helmet
 The Turbans, an American doo-wop group

See also
 Turbin, another surname
 Durban (disambiguation)